Dynamene (minor planet designation: 200 Dynamene) is a large dark main-belt asteroid that was discovered by German-American astronomer Christian Heinrich Friedrich Peters on July 27, 1879, in Clinton, New York. The name derives from Dynamene, one of the fifty Nereids in Greek mythology. Based upon its spectrum, 200 Dynamene is classified as a C-type asteroid, indicating that it probably has a primitive composition similar to the carbonaceous chondrite meteorites. The spectra of the asteroid displays evidence of aqueous alteration.

Photometric observations of this asteroid at the Organ Mesa Observatory in Las Cruces, New Mexico in 2011 gave a light curve with a period of 37.394 ± 0.002 hours and a brightness variation of 0.10 ± 0.01 in magnitude. The curve is asymmetrical with four uneven minima and maxima.

Occultation data from October 9, 2006, using 15 chords shows the asteroid is about 130 km in diameter.

References

External links 
 
 

000200
Discoveries by Christian Peters
Named minor planets
000200
000200
000200
18790727